In abstract algebra, a Valya algebra (or Valentina algebra) is a nonassociative algebra M over a field F whose multiplicative binary operation g satisfies the following axioms:

1. The skew-symmetry condition  
 
for all . 

2. The Valya identity 

for all , where k=1,2,...,6, and

3. The bilinear condition

We say that M is a Valya algebra if the commutant of this algebra is a Lie subalgebra. Each Lie algebra is a Valya algebra. 

There is the following relationship between the commutant-associative algebra and Valentina algebra. The replacement of the multiplication g(A,B) in an algebra M by the operation of commutation [A,B]=g(A,B)-g(B,A), makes it into the algebra . 
If M is a commutant-associative algebra, then  is a Valya algebra. A Valya algebra is a generalization of a Lie algebra.

Examples

Let us give the following examples regarding Valya algebras.

(1) Every finite Valya algebra is the tangent algebra of an analytic local commutant-associative loop (Valya loop) as each finite Lie algebra is the tangent algebra of an analytic local group (Lie group). This is the analog of the classical correspondence between analytic local groups (Lie groups) and Lie algebras.

(2) A bilinear operation for the differential 1-forms

on a symplectic manifold can be introduced by the rule
 
where  is 1-form. A set of all nonclosed 1-forms, together with this operation, is Lie algebra.

 and
 
A set of all closed 1-forms, together with this bracket, form a Lie algebra. A set of all nonclosed 1-forms together with the bilinear operation  is a Valya algebra, and it is not a Lie algebra.

See also
 Malcev algebra
 Alternative algebra
 Commutant-associative algebra

References
 A. Elduque,  H. C. Myung Mutations of alternative algebras,  Kluwer Academic Publishers, Boston, 1994, 
 
 M.V. Karasev, V.P. Maslov, Nonlinear Poisson Brackets: Geometry and Quantization. American Mathematical Society, Providence, 1993.
 A.G. Kurosh, Lectures on general algebra. Translated from the Russian edition (Moscow, 1960) by K. A. Hirsch. Chelsea, New York, 1963. 335 pp.    
 A.G. Kurosh, General algebra. Lectures for the academic year 1969/70. Nauka, Moscow,1974.  (In Russian)
 A.I. Mal'tsev, Algebraic systems. Springer, 1973.  (Translated from Russian)
 A.I. Mal'tsev, Analytic loops.  Mat. Sb., 36 : 3  (1955)  pp. 569–576  (In Russian)
 
 V.E. Tarasov Quantum Mechanics of Non-Hamiltonian and Dissipative Systems. Elsevier Science, Amsterdam, Boston, London, New York, 2008.  
 V.E. Tarasov, "Quantum dissipative systems: IV. Analogues of Lie algebras and groups" Theoretical and Mathematical Physics. Vol.110. No.2. (1997) pp.168-178. 

Non-associative algebras
Lie algebras